Rita Récsei (born 30 January 1996) is a Hungarian race walker. She competed in the women's 20 kilometres walk event at the 2016 Summer Olympics. In 2018, she competed in the women's 20 kilometres walk event at the 2018 European Athletics Championships held in Berlin, Germany. She finished in 25th place.

References

External links
 
 
 
 
 

1996 births
Living people
Hungarian female racewalkers
Sportspeople from Pécs
Olympic athletes of Hungary
Athletes (track and field) at the 2016 Summer Olympics